Marva or Marwa is a hexatonic Indian raga; Pa (the fifth tone) is omitted. Marva is the eponymous raga of the Marva thaat.

Aroha and Avaroha 

Arohana: 'Ni  Ga  Dha Ni  S'

Keeping the key in C, in the Western scale this would roughly translate to: B  D♭  E F♯ A B  D♭  C

Avarohana:  Ni Dha  Ga  'Ni 'Dha Sa

The Ma is actually Ma Tivratara, which is a perfect fourth above Re komal (which is 112 cents above Sa))

Vadi and Samvadi 

The Vadi is komal Re, while the Samvadi is shuddh Dha. Notice that these do not form a perfect interval. So V.N.Paṭvardhan  says "It is customary to give Re and Dha as vādi and saṃvādi, but seen from the point of view of the śāstras (treatises) it is not possible for re and Dha to be saṃvādī (i.e. consonant) to each other. For this reason, in our opinion it is proper to accept Dha as vādī and Ga as saṃvādī"  On the other hand if Ga receives too much emphasis, it would create the impression of raga Puriya

Pakad or Chalan

Sa is omitted within a taan; it may only be used at the end of a phrase and even then is used infrequently. Bhatkhande gives the pakad as Dha  Ga , Ga  Ga, Sa. Patwardan has shown the mukhya ang as  Ga  Dha, Dha  Ga , but points out that the raga is also clearly indicated by: 'Ni  Ga  Dha, Dha  Ga  'Ni  Sa.

The chalan given by Ruckert is: 'Ni 'Dha  'Ni 'Dha  'Ni 'Dha 'Ni 'Dha Sa  Ga  Dha  Ni Dha  Ga   Sa 'Ni 'Dha  Sa

Organisation & Relationships 

Thaat: Marwa).

Puriya and Sohni have the same tonal material. In Puriya Ni and specially Ga are emphasised.

Komal re of Marwa is slightly higher than komal re of Bhairavi

According to O.Thakur Pūrvā Kalyāṇa is Marwa with Pa and less emphasis on komal Re. R. Jha treats Bhaṭiya as a mixture of Marwa and Maand. There is only one Author (B. Subba Rao) mentioning a raga Māravā Gaurī, thus Moutal does not consider this an own form. Aspects of Marwa are also incorporated in Mali Gaura

For western listeners the tone material may feel strange. As the sixth is emphasised while the tonic is omitted it may feel like playing in A Major, while the base tone is C (not C sharp). If the musician turns back to Sa at the end of a phrase it always comes like a surprise note.

Behaviour 
Ni is not a leading note to Sa. Because Sa is omitted Ni leads to re or Dha (and then only to Sa), as in "Ḍ Ṇ r S" or "r Ṇ Ḍ S" .

Samay (Time)
Sunset
5:30 pm

Rasa
Bor characterizes Marwa as "heroic". In ragamala paintings Malav (see history) is often pictured as lovers walking towards the bed-chamber.

Marwa is also characterised as quiet, contemplative, representing gentle love. According to Kaufmann is the overall mood defined by the sunset in India, which approaches fast and this "onrushing darkness awakes in many observers a feeling of anxiety and solemn expectation".

Puṇḍarika Viṭṭhala describes as follows:" The king at war always worship Maravi, whose face shines like the moon and who has long tresses of hair. With moist eyes, faintly smiling, she is adorned skillfully with sweet smelling flowers of different varieties. Her complexion gleams like gold; she is attired in red and her eyes are like those of a fawn. She is the elder sister of Mewar. In Marwa Ni and Ga are sharp, Sa is the graha and amsa and Ri and Dha are the nyasa".

Historical Information
Marwa's forerunners (Maru or Maruva) have different scales in the literature from the 16th century onwards. Pratap Singh (end of 18th century) writes that Marwa is the same as the ancient Mālavā, and its melodic outline is very similar to today's Marwa  Also Jairazbhoy reports that Locana's Mālavā "may be the origin of modern Mārvā"

Important Recordings
 Amir Khan, Ragas Marwa and Darbari, Odeon LP (long-playing record), ODEON-MOAE 103, later reissued by HMV as EMI-EALP1253. This recording redefined Marwa by moving the primary development down to the lower octave compared to the traditionally middle octave.
 Ravi Shankar, "In New York", Angel Records (July 18, 2000). ASIN: B00004U92S. Original Recording 1968.
 Imrat Khan, "Raga Marwa", Nimbus Records (1992), NI 5356 (recorded July 10, 1990)
 Ali Akbar Khan, "Raag Marwa" Connoisseur Society US (1968)
Ustad Rashid Khan, "Raag Marwa" Masterworks from the NCPA archives (Aug 1984)
 “Friends” by Led Zeppelin

References

External links 
Detailed analysis of Raga Marwa and associated ragas by Rajan Parrikar; backed by audio samples.
 More details about raga Marwa

Literature 

Hindustani ragas